Frank Brooman (Born April to June 1904, St Pancras, London-Date of death unknown) is an English boxer who competed in the 1930 British Empire Games.

At the 1930 Empire Games, he won the bronze medal in the welterweight class.

References

External links
commonwealthgames.com results

1904 births
Year of death missing
English male boxers
Welterweight boxers
Boxers at the 1930 British Empire Games
Commonwealth Games bronze medallists for England
People from St Pancras, London
Boxers from Greater London
Commonwealth Games medallists in boxing
Medallists at the 1930 British Empire Games